Tick tock, tic toc, TikTok and other variants may refer to:

Arts, entertainment, and media

 Tick-Tock (character), a fictional mutant from the Marvel Comics universe
 Tick-tock (journalism), a story focused on a chronological order of events
 TicToc, former name of the social media news product Bloomberg Quicktake
 TikTok, a social media platform for creating and sharing short-form mobile video clips and commentary

Film and TV
 Project Tic-Toc, a plot element in the television series The Time Tunnel
 "Tic-Toc", a phrase in the television series Watchmen
 Tick Tock (film), a 2018 Pakistani computer-animated adventure film
 "Tick Tock", an episode of the animated television series Lego Ninjago: Masters of Spinjitzu
 Tick-Tock the Crocodile, a character in the television series Jake and the Never Land Pirates
 "Tick-Tock, Bitches", an episode of the television series Pretty Little Liars
 Tik Tok (film), a 2016 Chinese-South Korean suspense crime drama
 Tiktok (film), a 2015 Ugandan silent short film

Literature
 Ticktock (novel), a 1996 comedy/horror novel by Dean Koontz
 Tik-Tok (novel), a 1983 science-fiction novel by John Sladek
 Tik-Tok of Oz, a 1914 novel in the Oz series
 Tik-Tok (Oz), a character in the Oz series by L. Frank Baum

Music

 Tick Tock (band), from Puerto Rico

Albums 
 Tick Tock, a 2009 album by Gazpacho (band)

Songs 
 "Tic Toc" (song), by Lords of the Underground
 "Tic Toc", a song by 6ix9ine featuring Lil Baby from Dummy Boy
 "Tic Toc", a song by Baby Cham from Ghetto Story
 "Tic Toc", a song by LeAnn Rimes from Twisted Angel
 "Tic Toc", a song by Merrill Nisker from Fancypants Hoodlum
 "Tic-Toc", a song by Belanova from Sueño Electro I
 "Tick Tock (Beat The Clock)", or "Qing Chun Dou", a song by Rainie Yang
 "Tick Tock" (Clean Bandit and Mabel song), 2020
 "Tick Tock" (Lemar song), 2007
 "Tick Tock" (Young Thug song), 2021
 "Tick Tock", a song by Beverley Craven from Mixed Emotions
 "Tick-Tock" (Albina Grčić song), 2021
  "Tick-Tock", a 2014 song by Mariya Yaremchuk
 "Tick-Tock", a song from the musical Company
 "Tik Tok" (song), a song by Kesha, 2009
 "Tik Tok", a song by Bob Sinclar featuring Sean Paul, 2010
 "Tik Tok", a song by G.E.M. from My Fairytale

Other uses
 Tick Tock Clock, a level in Super Mario 64
 Tic Tocs, a biscuit made by Arnott's Biscuits
 Tic:Toc Home Loans, the name of an Australian fintech
 Tick Tock, a type of cheerleading stunt
 Tick-Tock model, a microprocessor development model originated by Intel
 "Tick... Tock...", the sound made by some clocks, for example a pendulum clock

See also
 Tic tac (disambiguation)
 Tic Toc Tic, a 2010 album by The Zolas
 Tickety Tock, an alarm clock from the television series Blue's Clues
 Tik and Tok, a British musical duo